Sabulina verna, the golden moss or Irish moss, is a terrestrial plant in the genus Sabulina.

References

Caryophyllaceae